Budaka District is a district in the Eastern Region of Uganda. The town of Budaka is the site of the district headquarters.

Location
Budaka district is bordered by Pallisa District to the north, Mbale District to the east, Butaleja District to the south, and Kibuku District to the west.

Overview

The district consists of Budaka County and Iki-Iki County.

Population
In 1991, the national population census estimated the population of the district at 100,300. The 2002 national census estimated the population at 136,500, with an annual population growth rate of 2.8 percent. In 2012, the population was estimated at 178,900.

Economic activities
In 2009, a tile and brick manufacturing plant was opened at Kamonkoli by Uganda Clays Limited. The factory employs over 200 people.

References

External links
 Kuwait Investors to Build Cement Plant In Budaka, Uganda                       
 Kuwait Investors to Construct Cement Factory In Budaka

 
Districts of Uganda
Eastern Region, Uganda
Districts in Uganda